The Grade Cricketer is the pen name of three Australian cricket writers, Sam Perry, Dave Edwards and Ian Higgins. They were friends who played grade cricket in Australia and began a Twitter account as @gradecricketer. They subsequently wrote books and columns and host a podcast. In July 2020 it was announced Dave Edwards had left the group to focus on other commitments.

Books
The Grade Cricketer (2016)
Tea and No Sympathy (2017)

Podcast 
The Grade Cricketer Podcast is presented by the three creators of the persona during the Australian cricketing summer, and is a comedic, satirical take on the cricketing world. There have been four seasons since the promo episode was released in October 2016. Music is provided by Adrian Leung, with cover design by Julia Dowe.

Format 
Video on youtube and audio as a pocast on various podcast apps such as spotify and google podcasts
 Interviews 
At least one guest is usually interviewed in each episode, and the format regularly involves one interview with a cricket journalist, and a further one later on with a current or former player. These always begin with some form of the question "What's your relationship with Grade Cricket?"; whilst the player interviews end with throw-downs, in which the presenters ask ridiculous, long-winded questions, to which the guest can often respond only with a binary yes/no answer. The most frequent guests, also known as "best friends of the show", are Adam "Collo" Collins from the journalism world, with ten appearances, and Ed "Ted" Cowan from the players with six (also the first guest, having to re-record his interview after a technical mishap - this has now occurred twice).

 AskTGC 
The last section of the podcast normally involves answering questions submitted to The Grade Cricketer via social media, (the Twitter hashtag being #askTGC, hence the name). These questions are often incredibly long, leading Higgins to sometimes refer to the section as their "short story competition", but also sometimes little more than a statement followed by "thoughts?", and regularly concern topics such as alpha-ing, father-son relationships, social status within clubs/teams, retirement from the game, and other general advice relating to the world of amateur cricket.

 Advertisements 
Over the course of the podcast run, advertisements for various products, both real and imaginary tie-in ones, have been inserted, voiced by Toby Shain and, occasionally, the hosts themselves. Products include:

 Fake Products/services 

 Chop King Cologne: a fragrance inspired by the concept of the Chop King, with the tagline of "reek of runs without hitting them".
 The Grade Cricket Rehabilitation Centre: a centre for reintegrating former grade cricket players into normal society.
 Reno Rampage: a parody of a Renovation Rescue-style show, specifically aimed at renovating grade cricket clubhouses.
Bravago: a parody of travel company Trivago.
Alpha-Ade: a fictional sportsdrink, parodying Gator/Powerade 

 Real Products/services 

OLED TV's: a parody of David Warner's advertisements for the same product during the 2016/17 Australian home summer series.
 Grade cricketThe Grade Cricketer: Tea and No Sympathy (2017)''

Episode guide

TV Show
In 2018, The Grade Cricketer on 7 show was launched on 7Sport's YouTube channel. The season covered the 2018/19 summer of cricket and featured 11 episodes featuring all of the trio. In 2019, The Grade Cricketer on 7 was moved to 7plus for season 2 covering the 2019/20 summer of cricket, however season 2 was only presented by Ian Higgins and Sam Perry.

Live Shows
The Grade Cricketer has presented live shows over multiple Australian Summers and the English Summer of 2019, during the 2019 World Cup and 2019 Ashes. The Live Shows like the podcasts also normally feature guests.

Terminology 
Many terms have been popularised through the books and podcast efforts of The Grade Cricketer. These include:

 to alpha: to exert dominance over another person, by word or action
 to beta: to be alphaed
 rig: the physical conditioning of a person's body. In the words of one of the founders, Sam Perry, “rig is more of a holistic thing. It’s basically everything you are setting up.”
 to champ someone: to call another person by "champion" or any derivation of the word, including, but not limited to: champ, champignon, Champs-Élysées, Champions League
 circuit: post-game revelry enjoyed with teammates at various drinking establishments
 a chop: a sexual conquest

Other terms commonly used, particularly in the AskTGC correspondence section of the podcast, include:

 levers: arms, specifically with reference to a batsman's six-hitting ability
 salad: a person's head hair
 triple C: Century-Circuit-Chop; the rare event of all the following events achieved on the same day/night in order: 1. a player scoring a century 2. enjoying a noteworthy night out, or circuit, with their teammates 3. having sexual intercourse.
 pipes: biceps
 Chop King: one proficient in chopping. Also the name of the self-endorsed cologne with the tag line “Reek of runs without actually scoring them.”

References

External links
 Grade Cricketer Podcast
 Twitter account
 The Grade Cricketer Website

Australian cricket writers
Living people
Australian podcasters
Year of birth missing (living people)